Leron "Boogie" Black (born January 31, 1996) is an American professional basketball player for Soles de Mexicali of the LNBP. He played college basketball for the University of Illinois. He also played for Argentino de Junín from LNB before moving to the Brazilian League (NBB).

High school career
In September 2012, Black verbally committed to Baylor University to play basketball, only to de-commit in January 2013. At the time in 2012, Black was actually the first top 25 recruit to announce his verbal commitment. Black explained that he committed to Baylor too early before exploring all of his options available. In talking about schools he was considering, Black listed UConn, Florida, Illinois, Indiana, Louisville, Memphis, and Ohio State.

After his official visit to Illinois, Black verbally committed to the program and coach John Groce on September 1, 2013. On November 15, 2013, Black then signed his National Letter of Intent to play for Illinois starting in the 2014–15 season. During his senior season, Black averaged 20.2 points and 12.9 rebounds and lead White Station to a 30–3 record. Black was named Class AAA Tennessee Mr. Basketball for 2014, the Gatorade Tennessee Boys Basketball Player of the Year for 2014 and was named First team All-State by USA Today.

College career
In his first career start on January 21, 2015, Black posted a double-double in a win against Purdue with 15 points and a career high 13 rebounds, becoming the first Illinois player since Lowell Hamilton to post a double-double in his first career start.

On October 8, 2015, it was announced that Black would miss 4–6 weeks after having surgery to repair a Meniscus tear in his knee. He returned to the lineup during the win against North Dakota State on November 15, 2015.

Following the 2017–18 season, Black was named to the honorable mention All Big-10 team by both the coaches and media.

College statistics

|-
| style="text-align:left;"| 2014–15
| style="text-align:left;"| Illinois
| 33 || 10 || 14.8 || .475 || .000 || .682 || 4.3 || .1 || .3 || .2 || 5.0
|-
| style="text-align:left;"| 2015–16
| style="text-align:left;"| Illinois
| 7 || 3 || 14.3 || .417 || .000 || .500 || 4.4 || .6 || .3 || .3 || 4.4
|-
| style="text-align:left;"| 2016–17
| style="text-align:left;"| Illinois
| 31 || 27 || 20.2 || .453 || .297 || .722 || 6.3 || .4 || .5 || .1 || 8.1
|-
| style="text-align:left;"| 2017–18
| style="text-align:left;"| Illinois
| 31 || 30 || 25.5 || .547 || .512 || .800 || 5.2 || .8 || .3 || .3 || 15.3
|-
|style="text-align:center;" colspan="2"|Career
| 102 || 70 || 19.6 || .499 || .398 || .749 || 5.2 || .5 || .4 || .2 || 9.0
|-

Professional career
On March 15, 2018, Black announced he would forego his final season of eligibility at Illinois to pursue a professional basketball career. He was not selected in the 2018 NBA Draft.

On August 5, 2018, Black signed a one-year deal with the Israeli team Elitzur Yavne of the Liga Leumit. However, on October 8, 2018, Black parted ways with Yavne before appearing in a game for them.

On October 20, 2018, Black was selected with the 25th pick in the first round of the 2018 NBA G League Draft by the Raptors 905. On November 1, 2018, the Raptors 905 announced that they had waived him from training camp.

On November 30, 2018, Black signed with Argentino de Junín of the Liga Nacional de Básquet in Argentina.

On July 3, 2019, Black signed with Flamengo to play the 2019–20 NBB season in Brazil. In 11 games he averaged 3.0 points and 1.7 rebounds per game. Black joined Minas for the remainder of the season and averaged 4.3 points and 1.7 rebounds per game. On August 8, 2020, Black signed with Abejas de León of the LNBP.

The Basketball Tournament
Black joined House of 'Paign, a team composed primarily of Illinois alumni in The Basketball Tournament 2020. He scored two points in a 76–53 win over War Tampa in the first round.

International play
In May 2014, Black was among the 24 players who earned an invitation to the training camp for USA Basketball FIBA Americas Under-18 Championship at the United States Olympic Training Center in Colorado Springs, Colorado.

References

External links
Illinois Fighting Illini bio
Career Statistics

1995 births
Living people
Abejas de León players
African-American basketball players
American expatriate basketball people in Argentina
American expatriate basketball people in Brazil
American expatriate basketball people in Mexico
American men's basketball players
Argentino de Junín basketball players
Basketball players from Memphis, Tennessee
Flamengo basketball players
Illinois Fighting Illini men's basketball players
Novo Basquete Brasil players
Small forwards
21st-century African-American sportspeople